Donald Murphy may refer to:

Don Murphy (born 1967), American film producer
Donald E. Murphy (born 1960), Maryland politician
Don Murphy (Cubmaster), creator of the Pinewood derby
Donald Wayne Murphy (born 1950), author and parks and recreation official
Donald Murphy (actor), American film and television actor
Donald Murphy (serial killer), American serial killer, sex offender and bank robber
Donal Murphy (born 1955), Irish footballer

See also 
Don Murray (disambiguation)
Donald Murray (disambiguation)